Simulations Plus, Inc. develops absorption, distribution, metabolism, excretion, and toxicity (ADMET) modeling and simulation software for the pharmaceutical and biotechnology, industrial chemicals, cosmetics, food ingredients, and herbicide industries. In September 2014, the company acquired Cognigen Corporation, a provider of clinical trial data analysis and consulting services.

References
Simulations Plus, Inc. - San Fernando Valley Business Journal - December 29, 2010
 Simulations Plus, Inc. - New York Times - Company Information
Simulations Plus, Inc. - Datamonitor Company Profiles via Alacra Store - May 23, 2008

External links

Companies based in Los Angeles County, California
Simulation software
Companies listed on the Nasdaq